The Ulster Cricket Club was an Irish cricket club based in Ballynafeigh, Belfast. Formed in 1873, it was one of the leading Irish cricket clubs in the Victorian period, but went out of existence in 1931. The Ulster Football Club was formed by its members in 1877.

Honours
NCU Senior League: 1
1922
NCU Challenge Cup: 4
1895, 1909, 1911, 1930
NCU Junior Cup: †2
†1892, †1911

† Won by 2nd XI (Ulidia)

See also
Ulster F.C.

References

Defunct cricket clubs in Ireland
Sports clubs in Belfast